Gabrnik is a Slovene place name that may refer to: 

Gabernik, a settlement in the Municipality of Slovenska Bistrica, northeastern Slovenia, sometimes spelled Gabrnik
Gabrnik, Juršinci, a settlement in the Municipality of Juršinci, northeastern Slovenia
Gabrnik, Škocjan, a settlement in the Municipality of Škocjan, southeastern Slovenia
Spodnji Gabernik (formerly Spodnji Gabrnik), a settlement in the Municipality of Rogaška Slatina, northeastern Slovenia
Zgornji Gabrnik, a settlement in the Municipality of Rogaška Slatina, northeastern Slovenia